Macroglossum vicinum, or Jordan's hummingbird hawkmoth, is a moth of the family Sphingidae. It is known from southern India, southern China and Thailand.

The wingspan is 40–48 mm. It is a forest species which is on wing during the rainy season.

Larvae have been recorded feeding on Chassalia curviflora.

Subspecies
Macroglossum vicinum vicinum
Macroglossum vicinum piepersi Dupont, 1941 (Thailand)

References

Macroglossum
Moths described in 1923